The 2022 All Japan High School Women's Soccer Tournament (第31回全日本高等学校女子サッカー選手権大会; All Japan 31st High School Soccer Tournament) marks the 31st edition of the referred annually contested women's cup for High Schools over Japan. The tournament is contested by 32 high schools in a knockout-stage format. The final will be played one day prior to the men's final, on 8 January 2023, at the Noevir Stadium Kobe. The Kamimura Gakuen High School are the defending champions, winning the last championship by 3–0 against the Hinomoto Gakuen High School.

Just like the men's tournament, from the first round (round of 32) to the quarter-finals, the matches will have a duration of 80 minutes, split into two halves of 40 minutes each. The semi-finals and the final will have the matches lasting 90 minutes. Should a match be tied, the match will directly go into penalty shoot-outs, except for the final, where overtime will be played if the match keeps tied for 90 minutes.

Calendar
The tournament will take place in a 11-day span, with the tournament split in a total of 5 stages.

Venues
All the matches will be played in the Hyogo Prefecture. Some of the stadiums will utilize two grounds, or fields, at the same place, to be able to simultaneously hold matches. The venues and the city they are located in are as follows:

Miki
Miki Athletic Stadium (No. 1 and No.2) – Host matches from the round of 16 to the quarter-finals
Mikibo Football Ground (No.1 and No.2) – Host matches from the round of 16 to the quarter-finals
Sumoto
Awaji Sports Park (Main and sub-ground) – Host Round of 32 matches
Kobe
Ibuki Forest Training Ground (A and B ground) – Host Round of 32 matches
Noevir Stadium Kobe  – Host the three final matches from the semi-final round

Participating clubs
The Hyogo prefectural qualification was the only one to directly qualify a prefectural qualification winner for the national competition without needing to play the regional qualification, as the Hyogo Prefecture will host the tournament, being granted to have a team to represent the prefecture as its tournament winner, and as its host team.
In parenthesis: Each school's performance at the regional qualifying series.

Schedule

First round

Round of 16

Quarter-finals

Semi-finals

Final

References

External links
Official Schedule (JFA)
About the Tournament (JFA)

Women's football competitions in Japan
2022 in Japanese women's football
All Japan High School Women's Soccer Tournament